SagamoreHill Broadcasting LLC is a privately held American holding company that owns 13 television stations based in the Great Lakes and southern United States regions. The company is a joint venture of the investment firm Duff Ackerman & Goodrich of San Francisco, California and former Benedek Broadcasting and Spartan Communications executive Louis Wall (who is also CEO of the group).

The company is headquartered in Augusta, Georgia.

History
The company was founded in 2003.

In 2005, SagamoreHill Broadcasting acquired KXLT-TV in Rochester, Minnesota as a result of Quincy Newspapers' purchase of Shockley Communications (the former owner of KXLT-TV), and Quincy could not buy KXLT outright due to Federal Communications Commission (FCC) rules governing duopolies.

In 2007, SagamoreHill Broadcasting acquired WLTZ in Columbus, Georgia from J. Curtis Lewis.

On July 23, 2008, SagamoreHill Broadcasting acquired the license of KZTV in Corpus Christi, Texas to comply with Federal Communications Commission (FCC) rules; it was originally sold by Eagle Creek Broadcasting (KZTV's former owner) to Cordillera Communications. However, the application to sell the station was opposed by McKinnon Broadcasting, then-owner of KIII. This objection held up the deal until August 24, 2009, when Eagle Creek announced a shared services agreement with KRIS-TV. Cordillera acquired all station assets with Eagle Creek owning KZTV's broadcast license. SagamoreHill finally assumed ownership of the KZTV license on May 19, 2010.

In 2017, the company acquired the license assets of Surtsey Media/Saga Communications' television clusters in Joplin, Missouri, including KOAM-TV, and Victoria, Texas, including KAVU-TV. SagamoreHill became the owner of KFJX in Joplin, Missouri, and KVCT in Victoria, Texas; both stations are operated by Morgan Murphy Media.

Stations

Current

Notes:
1 Operated by Bahakel Communications through a shared services agreement (SSA).
2 Operated by Gray Television through an SSA.
3 Operated by Morgan Murphy Media through an SSA.
4 Operated by the E. W. Scripps Company through an SSA.
5 Operated by Waypoint Media through an SSA.

Former

Notes:
1 Under SagamoreHill ownership, it was operated by Meredith Corporation through an SSA.
2 Under SagamoreHill ownership, it was operated by Barrington Broadcasting through an SSA.

References

External links
Official Website

 
Mass media companies established in 2003
Companies based in Montgomery, Alabama
Television broadcasting companies of the United States